The Cook Report was a British ITV current affairs television programme presented by Roger Cook which was broadcast from 22 July 1987 to 24 August 1999. The series featured the journalist investigating corruption, criminals, government social policy failures, and unmasking coverups due to incompetence, negligence and dishonesty. All sixteen series were produced for ITV by Central Television. The series was well known for Cook's reporting style where he would present those being investigated with the evidence that the show had collected; often this would result in the journalist being attacked and occasionally hurt by those he confronted.

History
Over 12 years, and sixteen series, the programme featured Roger Cook travelling the world to investigate serious criminal activity, injustice and official incompetence. During its ground-breaking undercover 'stings', Cook confronted targets, and he and the film crew sometimes suffered verbal and physical abuse. The Cook Report was by some margin the highest rated current affairs programme on British television, with audiences peaking at more than 12 million. It was credited with helping to achieve numerous criminal convictions and a number of changes in the law.

Amongst the many subjects tackled, the programme exposed Northern Ireland protection rackets, baby trading in Brazil and Guatemala, canned hunting in South Africa, loan sharks, the ivory trade, people smuggling, drug dealing, mock auctions, counterfeit consumer goods, manipulation of the UK Singles Chart, war criminals in Bosnia, Clenbuterol in British Beef, the illegal trading of exotic birds, the rise of triads in Britain, Neo-Nazis in Germany, The Hillsborough disaster, steroid dealing, the Russian black market in weapons-grade plutonium and Satanic Ritual Abuse.

In July 1990 the show investigated the Tainted Blood Scandal focusing on how Haemophiliacs had become infected with HIV by using Contaminated Blood Products. In total some 1,243 people in the UK were infected with HIV through using these products. At the time of the show some 100 had died of AIDS, as of 2017 the total number of those who have died who were infected with HIV is closer to 1,000. Since the show aired the scandal has roared on and continues to be debated in British Parliament as victims and their families still fight for justice.

Cook Report Specials
The Cook Report ran regularly for two seven-part series each year until 1997, when the programme reached its 122nd edition. It was then replaced by a number of hour-long Cook Report Specials including:

Doctors From Hell  (24 August 1999)
Locks, Stocks, Burglars and Fences  (23 April 1999)
The Dodgy Motor Show  (3 December 1998)
The Antiques Rogue Show  (19 August 1998)
Profits Before Patients (23 July 1990)
The Devil's Work (17 July 1989)

Cancellation
The Cook Report came to an end in 1999 when ITV, which had previously cancelled a number of current affairs programmes made for the channel (including World in Action) was faced with dwindling budgets and had concentrated on other kinds of programming. The ITV Network Centre decided to concentrate its current affairs efforts on Tonight - which, though it attracted fewer viewers, was said to be significantly less costly to make. Cook went on to work on other projects and is also Emeritus Visiting Professor at the Centre for Broadcasting and Journalism at Nottingham Trent University. He was made an Honorary Doctor of Letters in 2004.

The programme did return for a one-off, 90-minute special, Roger Cook's Greatest Hits, on 30 October 2007. This update episode was produced by ITV Productions and Interesting Films.

News of the World allegations
In February and April 2000, the News of the World published a series of front page allegations claiming that The Cook Report had faked a number of programmes in which crimes were set up for him to solve. Roger Cook and members of the relevant production teams issued writs for libel, against the paper. The newspaper demanded an investigation by the then regulator, the Independent Television Commission, after it sent its dossier of evidence about the programme which, after an eighteen-month investigation, in October 2001 exonerated the programme.

The News of the World initially dismissed the commission's findings as 'a whitewash', but after key witnesses for the defence had voluntarily retracted their paid-for testimony, the News of the World reluctantly had to agree with the ITC's conclusions and made the following statement to that effect in open court:

"The News of the World accepts that neither Mr Cook nor Carlton [TV] nor the editors, producers, legal advisers and researchers were a party to any fakery or deception."  It was also accepted that the allegations were false and should never have been published, but the subsequent short correction was printed on page 38. Mr Cook's solicitor, Ian Bloom, described the allegations as "devastating for Mr Cook both professionally and personally, while the News of the World accepts that neither Mr Cook nor Carlton nor the editors, producers, legal advisers or researchers were a party to any fakery or deception. While it is accepted that the NoW believed that it had grounds to look into the matter, the News of the World now acknowledges that the articles contained material inaccuracies which should not have been published,"

Awards
The programme and its production team won eleven national and international awards, culminating in a British Academy of Film & Television Arts (BAFTA) special award for its presenter in 1997 'for 25 years of outstanding quality investigative reporting.

References

External links

Roger Cook Profile
The full list of episodes
The full list of Special episodes
Background information on research for The Devil's Work

1987 British television series debuts
1999 British television series endings
1980s British documentary television series
1990s British documentary television series
ITV documentaries
Investigative documentary television series
Television series by ITV Studios
Television shows produced by Central Independent Television
English-language television shows